Republic Square or Square of the Republic, at first named Revolution Square, is the largest square in Ljubljana, the capital of Slovenia. It was designed in the second half of the 20th century by Edvard Ravnikar. Independence of Slovenia was declared here on 26 June 1991. The National Assembly Building stands at its northern side and Cankar Hall at the southern side.

References

External links

 Virtual panorama of Republic Square. Burger.si.

 
Squares in Ljubljana
Center District, Ljubljana